Kwak Mi-ran (born ) is a South Korean female volleyball player.
She was part of the South Korea women's national volleyball team at the 2007 FIVB Volleyball Women's World Cup.

Clubs
 Korea Highway Corp (2007)

References

External links
profile at fivb.org

1981 births
Living people
South Korean women's volleyball players